Finback Massif is a massif in Antarctica, rising to more than  between Stubb Glacier and Flask Glacier. The name is one of several applied by the UK Antarctic Place-Names Committee in this vicinity that reflects a whaling theme, the finback being a species of baleen whale.

References 

Mountains of Graham Land
Oscar II Coast